The 19th Texas Infantry Regiment was a unit of volunteers recruited in Texas that fought in the Confederate States Army during the American Civil War. The regiment began organizing in February 1862 and elected its officers in May 1862. It spent its entire existence west of the Mississippi River in the Trans-Mississippi Department. In fall 1862, the unit was assigned to the 3rd Brigade of the Texas infantry division known as Walker's Greyhounds and fought at Milliken's Bend in June 1863. The unit was in action at Mansfield, Pleasant Hill, and Jenkins' Ferry in 1864. The last units in the Trans-Mississippi surrendered in June 1865, but the 19th Regiment had already disbanded before that date.

Notes

References

 

Units and formations of the Confederate States Army from Texas
1862 establishments in Texas
Military units and formations established in 1862
1865 disestablishments in Texas
Military units and formations disestablished in 1865